Le Bateau ("The Boat") is a paper-cut from 1953 by Henri Matisse. The picture is composed from pieces of paper cut out of sheets painted with gouache, and was created during the last years of Matisse's life.

History
Le Bateau caused a minor stir when the Museum of Modern Art, New York, which housed it, hung the work upside-down for 47 days in 1961 until Genevieve Habert, a stockbroker, noticed the mistake and notified a guard.  Habert later informed The New York Times, which in turn notified Monroe Wheeler, the Museum's art director.  As a result, the artwork was rehung properly.

References

Paintings by Henri Matisse
1953 paintings
Paintings in the collection of the Museum of Modern Art (New York City)
Ships in art